Monte San Valentino, also improperly known as Monte Parioli, is a hill in Rome (Italy), on the right side of the Tiber, reaching 98 m above sea level; together with Monte Cacciarello, it forms the Monti Parioli.
It is located in the north-west area of the town, within the Municipio II.

Origin of the name 
The hill is named after Saint Valentine, a bishop who died in Rome in the 3rd century.

Civil settlements 
The built-up area of the hill is mostly inhabited by upper-middle-class families.

Parks 
Nature reserve of Monte Mario

Hills of Rome
Geography of Rome